The 1929 Tipperary Senior Hurling Championship was the 39th staging of the Tipperary Senior Hurling Championship since its establishment by the Tipperary County Board in 1887.

Boherlahan were the defending champions.

Thurles Sarsfields won the championship after a 4-03 to 1-03 defeat of Toomevara in the final. It was their eighth championship title overall and their first title since 1911.

References

Tipperary
Tipperary Senior Hurling Championship